The 1991 Maui Invitational Tournament was an early-season college basketball tournament that was played, for the 8th time, from November 25 to November 27, 1991. The tournament, which began in 1984, was part of the 1991-92 NCAA Division I men's basketball season.  The tournament was played at the Lahaina Civic Center in Maui, Hawaii and was won by the Michigan State Spartans. It was the first title for the program and its head coach Jud Heathcote.

Bracket

References

Maui Invitational Tournament
Maui Invitational